Moycarn (also Moycarnon, Moycarnanan or Moycarne ) is a barony in County Roscommon, Republic of Ireland.

Etymology
The Irish name Maigh Charnáin means "plain of the cairn." It could also have a connection to Cernunnos, the Celtic hunt god.

Geography
Moycarn barony is located in the south of County Roscommon, north of the River Suck and River Shannon; they meet at the southern tip.

History

The Moycarn barony was anciently called Clan Laithemhain or Muintir Cionaith, ruled by the Gaelic Irish tribes of MacGilla Finnagain (O'Finnegan) and Ó Cionnaoith (Kenny).

It is referred to in the topographical poem Tuilleadh feasa ar Éirinn óigh (Giolla na Naomh Ó hUidhrín, d. 1420): 
Mac Giolla Fionnagáin maoiṫ
Agus Clann crodha Cionaoith
Dá droing ar aoḃḋa d' feadain
Ar Cloinn laomḋa Laiṫeaṁain
("Mac Gilla Finnegan the mild and the valiant Clan Kenny: two tribes who are fair so be seen rule over the brave Clan Flahavan.")

Notable later families in the barony include the ffrench and Potts.

List of settlements
Below is a list of settlements in Moycarn barony:
Old Town

References

Baronies of County Roscommon